"Heaven Knows" is a rock song performed by English rock singer Robert Plant. It was the first single to be released from his 1988 album Now and Zen. It reached number 33 on the UK singles chart and number 1 on the Billboard Album Rock Tracks chart. It was Plant's third number-one rock song, following 1983's "Other Arms" and 1985's "Little by Little."

The song was written by keyboardists Phil Johnstone (who also co-produced Now and Zen) and David Barratt.

Plant's former Led Zeppelin bandmate Jimmy Page played the guitar solo on the song.

References 

1988 singles
Robert Plant songs
Songs written by Phil Johnstone
1988 songs